The 17th Mixed Brigade was a unit of the Popular Army of the Republic that participated in the Spanish Civil War. Born in the context of the Battle of Madrid, took part in the Battle of Jarama and the fronts of Guadalajara.() was a division of the Spanish Republican Army in the Spanish Civil War. 
This unit was involved in the Battle of Jarama —and great part of the Battle of Madrid, suffering grievous losses in both battles.

The 17th Mixed Brigade was constituted, at the end of 1936, in Villarrobledo and the command was given to Lieutenant Colonel of Infantry Germán Madroñero López, having as commissar Manuel Simarro Quiles, of the PSOE. Madroñero was at the outbreak of the war, commander in the Wad-Ras Regiment No. 1 of Madrid. In mid-January 1937, the unit was mobilized and stationed in Ocaña with the intention that she would intervene in a planned offensive for Brunete, which will take time to complete. On 7 February, in the Battle of Jarama and framed in the group Burillo, he was entrusted with the defense of the Titulcia Bridge, but soon the Chorda Group was given the mission of protecting another bridge, that of Pindoque. The rebels managed to pass to the other shore, avoiding the destruction of the bridge, and the 17th mixed brigade had to go to close the gap and in relief of the 23rd WB. With the Division "B" in the E. of the Center and then the 13th DIVISION, its battalions 65,66,67 and 68 will reach renown. The unit will be changed to the 15th division to reinforce it and assign new competences in the front of Madrid until that in December 1937, Commander Castillo was replaced by Carlos Fabra Marín, the most veteran of the militias, to be replaced, then by the major of the same scale, Gregorio Herrero del Olmo, who, in turn, was six months later changed by the largest militia Manuel López Cabanas. The officers of the militias and commissars Gil Montoya and Vicente Abad Olmos, Angel Maynar Cebrián, of the PSOE and Pedro Tordesillas Sanz, were among the heads of their General Staff. Within III C. E. E. of the Center was in May 1938 entering to be part of the 18 DIVISION until March 1939.

History 
The brigade was officially created on 29 July 1936 while the militias of the Fifth Regiment were militarized and organized in the provinces of Madrid, Toledo, Cuenca and Guadalajara, with some soldiers assigned to the latter. The first commander of the unit was the eldest of the Lieutenant Colonel of German Infantry Madroñero, then the war arrives in Madrid and the jarama and is appointed political commissar, Angel Maynar Cebrián. The unit was framed in the 13th Division of the III Army Corps.

The 17th mixed brigade s, had begun with the reservation. In June the division became part of the Madrid Operations Army, which was formed by the 15a.

Jarama Battles 
In mid-January 1937 he concentrated on Morata, preparing for an offensive test in Brunete that had to be delayed. After being a reserve unit and relay in the defense of Madrid, after a brief rest in the rear, Alcalá de Henares, it mobilized to intervene as a buffer force of the regular forces of Buruaga, in the vicinity of The hill of Suicide and white house. With the duties of the battle of Jarama, he was entrusted with the conquest of Pingarrón in the first moments. It intervened in the Battle of Jarama attacking the hill of El Pingarrón in February, the unit was decimated and in first line, after being eliminated many soldiers, it is the moment in which Luis Alcázar is a new sergeant of this unit.

On 12 February he attacked the Cuesta de la Reina and, two days later, he faced the Pingarrón Vertex. The next day, it was framed in the "B" Division commanded by the Yugoslav general Gal, participating with her, again, in bloody battles around the Pingarrón. During these actions, Madroñero was relieved by the infantry commander Hilario Cid Manzano who, on 18 July 1936, was a retired captain in Madrid.

At the end of the fight in the Jarama, the 17th Brigade joined the 13th Division and with it in front of Madrid, with a command post in Morata de Tajuña, under the command of a forgotten character: Lieutenant Colonel Julián del Castillo Sánchez. He was a 72-year-old infantry lieutenant, retired in Madrid and winner of the Cruz de San Fernando prize in the Cuban War.

The 17th mixed brigade spent the rest of the war in a trench war, without fighting to be prominent, except for an attempt to break the front, to the desperate Francoist, to try to paralyze the national in the offensive Peñarroya, in January 1939 On 28 March, when the Madrid front surrendered, the Brigade closed its history.

Leaders 
Commanders
 Militia Lieutenant Germán Madroñero López (July 1936 - February 1937)
 Captain of Infantry Hilario Cid Manzano 14 February 1937 - June 1937).
 Lieutenant Colonel of Infantry Julián del Castillo Sánchez (July 1937- December 1937); 
 Militia Major (December 1937 - March 1938), Carlos Fabra Marín;
 Militia Major Gregorio Herrero del Olmo, March 1938 October 1938. 
 Militia major Manuel López Cabanas, October 1938 December 1938. 
 Militia Captain Vicente Abad Olmos; 
 Militia captain of Infantry (June 1937), Gil Montoya;

Commissars
Ángel Maynar Cebrián, member of the PSOE.
Pedro Tordesillas Sanz, member of General Staff.
Manuel Simarro Quiles, member of PCE.

See also
Mixed Brigades

Bibliography 
 Alpert, Michael (1989); El Ejército Republicano en la Guerra Civil, Siglo XXI de España, Madrid.
 Carlos Engel Masoliver|Engel Masoliver, Carlos (1999); Historia de las Brigadas mixtas del Ejército popular de la República, 1936-1939, Editorial Almena, Madrid, 1999 .
 Javier de Miguel (2007), Esfera de los libros, Madrid; La batalla del Jarama.
 Thomas, Hugh (1976); Historia de la Guerra Civil Española. Círculo de Lectores, Barcelona..
 Salas Larrazábal, Ramón (2006); Historia del Ejército Popular de la República. La Esfera de los Libros S.L.

References

External links
 SBHAC - El Ejército Popular
 Organización militar republicana - 1936 - La Guerra Civil 
 www.combatientes.es/17BrigadaMixta.htm

Military units and formations established in 1936
Military units and formations disestablished in 1939
Divisions of Spain
Military units and formations of the Spanish Civil War
Mixed Brigades (Spain)